Sir William Hawthorne Lewis, KCSI, KCIE (29 June 1888 – 19 October 1970) was a member of the Indian Civil Service who served as the Governor of Odisha from 1941 to 1946.

Educated at Oundle School and Gonville and Caius College, Cambridge, Lewis entered the Indian Civil Service by examination in 1911.

He laid the foundation stone for the Hirakud Dam in 1946.

References

External links 

 

Governors of Odisha
1888 births
1970 deaths
Indian Civil Service (British India) officers
Knights Commander of the Order of the Star of India
Knights Commander of the Order of the Indian Empire
People educated at Oundle School
Alumni of Gonville and Caius College, Cambridge
British people in colonial India